The 2014 Norwegian Football Cup Final was the 109th final of the Norwegian Football Cup. It was played on 23 November 2014 at Ullevaal Stadion, in Oslo, Norway. In the final Odd lost 2-0 to Molde, securing Molde's second cup title in a row and the double for the 2014 season. This was Molde's 7th cup final, while Odd traveled to Ullevaal for the 21st time. The winner will earn a place in the first qualifying round of the 2015–16 UEFA Europa League.

Route to the final

(TL) = Tippeligaen team
(D1) = 1. divisjon team
(D2) = 2. divisjon team
(D3) = 3. divisjon team

Pre-match

Supporters
In the recent years, the two clubs has received 13,000 of the 25,500 tickets to the final, but after the expansion of Ullevaal Stadion the two clubs received 15,250 of the 27,000 tickets to the final. The remaining 10,000 tickets went to partners of the Norwegian Football Association.

Match

Details

See also
2014 Norwegian Football Cup
2014 Tippeligaen
2014 1. divisjon
2014 in Norwegian football

References

2014
Odds BK matches
Molde FK matches
Cup
Sports competitions in Oslo
November 2014 sports events in Europe
2010s in Oslo
Final